The Small Voice (released in the United States as The Hideout) is a 1948 British thriller film directed by Fergus McDonell and starring Valerie Hobson, James Donald and Howard Keel (who was credited as Harold Keel). The film is part of a group of British film noir produced around this time. It was based on the 1940 novel of the same name by Robert Westerby.

The film's sets were designed by the art director Andrew Mazzei. It was the film debut of Howard Keel who made it while appearing in the original  London production of Oklahoma!

The film received a BAFTA nomination for Best British Film in 1949.

The "small voice" of the title is referred to at the end of the film: the small voice in your own head, of one's conscience telling one not to do something.

Plot
Three ex-army men escape from Dartmoor Prison and kill a man to get his car. Meanwhile, Mr and Mrs Byrne bicker on a train and discuss divorce before arriving at Llanbach in Wales near their home. He has lost a leg in the war, and is very bitter. As a result they have drifted apart. He is now a playwright.

As they drive along a country road at night they are stopped at a police road block, which is looking for the three escaped convicts. Five minutes later the couple spot broken glass and a missing parapet on an awkward bend and he goes to investigate. A man comes up the dark embankment and says there is another man in the car. The couple take them to their house, which is only a mile away, and intend to phone for medical assistance.

They treat the injured man in the kitchen but the first man disappears and steals their car. They are immediately suspicious and the injured man pulls a gun.

Back at the crash scene the first convict locates the third man and it is revealed that they hit another car. They search and find the car. The chauffeur is dead but two children are cowering in the back seat. They take the children back to the house.

Mr and Mrs Byrne are locked in one room together and joke about the irony. The children are locked in a room with the Byrnes' housekeeper, Mrs Potter.

The missing children's parents are at a police station trying to locate the missing car and children.

The next day the Sunday newspaper arrives and we learn that the escaped convicts have killed a policeman.

The well-educated children start correcting the convicts on their grammar. Mrs Potter distracts the convicts while Mrs Byrne escapes from an upper window. She is caught by the gang leader while trying to make a call from a telephone box. He later explains to Mr Byrne that he was born in Liverpool but raised in Chicago. He was in prison for killing an officer in his regiment.

The boy appears to have meningitis. The gang leader cannot stand the screaming and goes to shoot him. Mr Byrne finds an unattended gun and goes to shoot the leader. But he leaves the safety catch on. The leader points out the error, allowing Mr Byrne to kill him, ending the incident.

Cast
 Valerie Hobson as Eleanor Byrne 
 James Donald as Murray Byrne 
 Howard Keel (credited under his true name as Harold Keel) as Boke an escapee
 David Greene as Jim an escapee
 Michael Balfour as Frankie an escapee
 Joan Young as Mrs Potter, the housekeeper 
 Angela Fouldes as Jenny Moss. The credits in the film list her as Angela Faulds 
 Glyn Dearman as Ken Moss 
 Norman Claridge as Superintendent 
 Edward Evans as Police Inspector 
 Bill Shine as Maitland 
 Michael Hordern as Dr. Mennell 
 Edward Palmer as Joe Wallis 
 Lyn Evans as Ticket Collector

Critical reception
Virginia Graham wrote in The Spectator in 1948, "all this is admirably done, and eventually provides melodrama of an order as English and as excellent as muffins"; while TV Guide concluded that "the tension is sustained throughout, with some interesting plot twists along the way."

References

Bibliography
 Mayer, Geoff. Roy Ward Baker. Manchester University Press, 2004.

External links

Review of film at Variety

1948 films
British thriller films
1940s thriller films
Films directed by Fergus McDonell
Films produced by Anthony Havelock-Allan
British black-and-white films
1940s English-language films
1940s British films